Bolivia competed at the 2022 Winter Olympics in Beijing, China, from 4 to 20 February 2022.

Bolivia's team consisted of two men competing in two sports. Simon Breitfuss Kammerlander was the country's flagbearer during the opening ceremony. Meanwhile a volunteer was the flagbearer during the closing ceremony.

Competitors
The following is the list of number of competitors who participated at the Games per sport/discipline.

Alpine skiing

By meeting the basic qualification standards, Bolivia has qualified one male alpine skier.

Cross-country skiing

By meeting the basic qualification standards, Bolivia has qualified one male cross-country skier.

Distance

See also
Tropical nations at the Winter Olympics

References

Nations at the 2022 Winter Olympics
2022
2022 in Bolivian sport